Portrait of a Young Man is a painting by Raphael. It is often thought to be a self-portrait. During the Second World War the painting was stolen by the Germans from Poland. Many historians regard it as the most important painting missing since World War II.

The portrait is in oil on panel, probably from 1513 to 1514, and is by the Italian High Renaissance Old Master painter and architect Raffaello Sanzio da Urbino better known simply as Raphael.
The subject's identity is unverified, but many scholars have traditionally regarded it as Raphael's self-portrait. The facial features are perceived by specialists as compatible with, if not clearly identical to, the only undoubted self-portrait by Raphael in his fresco The School of Athens at the Vatican, identified as such by Vasari. If it is a self-portrait, no hint is given of Raphael's profession; the portrait shows a richly dressed and "confidently poised" young man.

No colour photographs of the painting were made before it disappeared; the colour image has been artificially coloured.

Analysis
As a portrait painting of the High Renaissance, Raphael's emphasis on erect poise, gesture, texture, decorous ornament, and softened form all represented cultivated Mannerist expression with the attributes of the noble class in a style which spread through southern Italy after Raphael's death. The textural details of a flesh-colored wall, sable fur, and wavy dark hair not only strike a Neo-Classical, sensitive balance between real humanity and nature, but they also extend gestures seen in previous female hand placement to stress man's role as a well-travelled humanist. Raphael humanized male gender so that the sleeve ribbon and hazy edges around both hair and landscape reflected the interchangeability of each gender. A left palm placed near the heart emphasized self-identity and a passionate stance. A striking contrast between pure white and sable intensified the doctrinal harmony between Heaven and Earth.

It is probable that Raphael's studious approach to the idealized representation of human proportion was based on his studies of ancient athletic and military heroes in Classical sculpture such as Doryphoros and Augustus of Prima Porta. The painting was brought to Poland, along with Leonardo da Vinci's Lady with an Ermine and many Roman antiquities, by Prince Adam George Czartoryski, son of Princess Izabela Czartoryska, on his travels to Italy in 1798.

The Nazi German theft  

At the onset of the Nazi German  invasion of Poland in 1939, then family patriarch Prince Augustyn Józef Czartoryski rescued numerous pieces from the Czartoryski Museum, including Portrait of a Young Man,  Leonardo's Lady with an Ermine and Rembrandt's masterpiece, Landscape with the Good Samaritan.  The collection was hidden at a residence in Sieniawa, but was later discovered by the Gestapo, working for Hans Frank, Hitler's appointee as the governor of the General Government. From the collection, these three paintings decorated Frank's residence in Kraków before they were sent to Berlin, and Dresden, to become part of the Führer's own collection at Linz, arranged by Hitler's plenipotentiary, Hans Posse.

In January 1945, Frank brought the paintings back from Germany to Kraków for his own use at the royal Wawel Castle. This is where Portrait of a Young Man was last seen. The Americans arrested Frank on May 3, 1945, pending trial for extensive war crimes (he was executed in 1946). The Polish representative at the Allies Commission for the Retrieval of Works of Art located some of the paintings stolen by him, and claimed them on behalf of the Czartoryski Museum. However, Portrait of a Young Man and 843 other artifacts were missing from storage. In her book on Nazi plunder, The Rape of Europa, Lynn H. Nicholas suggested that if the painting were to reappear today, it would be worth in excess of 100 million US dollars.

Unknown whereabouts 

After the Cold War, the Czartoryski family made a constant effort to locate the painting. In an interview, Prince Adam Czartoryski stated that he has tried to recover many of the paintings that were lost during the Second World War. The painting was placed in a three-piece collection of the Czartoryski family alongside Rembrandt's Landscape with the Good Samaritan and Leonardo's Lady with an Ermine. Unlike Portrait of a Young Man, the latter two paintings were found and kept. However, it is believed that the portrait is not lost but stolen.

The painting's location is unknown, although the Polish Ministry of Foreign Affairs states that it has been known "for years" the painting survived the war. However, in the summer of 2012 a false report about the painting's rediscovery appeared in popular media, attributed to an alleged statement made by a representative of the Polish Foreign Minister for the restitution of cultural property. It was reported to be hidden in a bank vault of an unidentified location. The Polish newsflash was a hoax intended to drum up readership. Soon afterward, the ministry spokesman explained in a public announcement that there are no new leads in regard to the whereabouts of the artwork; affirming their confidence in its express return to Poland once it is indeed found.

In 2016, the royal pieces moved from the Princes Czartoryski Museum after being bought by the Polish state. The original empty frame of the painting currently hangs in the National Museum of Krakow where the royal collection of works holds openings. The museum offers a reward of 100 million US dollars for its return.

Popular culture
The portrait appeared on The Simpsons episode "Raging Abe Simpson and His Grumbling Grandson in 'The Curse of the Flying Hellfish shows it as one of the paintings that Montgomery Burns and Abraham Simpson steal.  Once it's recovered it's turned over to the heir of its rightful owner by the US State Department.

In the 2014 film The Monuments Men, the painting is shown being destroyed by the Germans. It is shown as a prominent painting in a large cache of stolen art stored in an unidentified cave or mine that German troops set on fire with flamethrowers. The scene ends with a close-up of the painting as it starts to bubble and is then consumed by the flames. At the end of the film, during a briefing George Clooney's character Frank Stokes is giving to President Harry Truman in a darkened screening room, he projects a picture of the painting on the screen and groups it with many other known paintings still to be found.

The National Geographic Channel TV series Hunting Nazi Treasure explores the potential suspects of the theft of artwork in the episode 'Missing masterpiece'.

In the first episode of National Treasure: Edge of History, the series antagonist found the painting in a hidden cache in Madrid, Spain.

See also
 Art theft and looting during World War II
 Nazi plunder
 Looted art

Notes

References
 Houpt, Simon and Julian Radcliffe.  (2006).  Museum of the Missing: a History of Art Theft. New York: Sterling Publishing. ; ;
 Jones, Roger and Nicholas Penny. (1983).  Raphael. New Haven: Yale University Press. ; 
 Nicholas, Lynn H. (1994).   The Rape of Europa: The Fate of Europe’s Treasures in the Third Reich and the Second World War. New York City: Vintage Books. ;

External links

 Good online history of the painting
 PBS (Oregon Public Broadcasting): The Rape of Europa, 2006 film, aired November 24, 2008

1514 paintings
Lost paintings
Portraits by Raphael
Cultural history of World War II
Nazi-looted art